Ernesto Tomasini (born 15 May 1968, in Palermo, Italy) is an Italian actor/singer/writer living in Britain. Best known for his more recent forays into contemporary music, he has also had a 35-year career on the stage.

Early Performances
Tomasini begun his career at 16 on the Italian comedy circuit. Throughout his teens he devised comedy sketches and sang songs in smoky clubs and small cabaret spaces in his home town of Palermo. On one instance he caused a riot by performing his "outrageous" show at a conservative political party's celebrations. As his acts became more sophisticated (with original songs co-written by himself) he moved up to exclusive clubs until he landed on the legitimate stage, appearing next to one of Italy's leading stars of the time, Duilio Del Prete, in the national premiere of Franz Xaver Kroetz's Death on Christmas Night. After this he performed in numerous theatre productions, never abandoning his first love: Cabaret (something he continues to do to this day). He was the support act for TV comedian Nino Frassica and performed on the televised (RAI 3) Premio Anna Magnani. For the Scuola di Cabaret TV show, he created comic characters that became household names and in 1990 he was awarded the prize for best comedy act from Sicily.

Stage
In 1992 he moved to the UK where, after graduating at the Arts Educational London School, he worked as actor/singer on the West End stage ( Chicago the Musical), in Off-West End productions (Blind Summit's Mr China's Son) and with experimental theatre companies (Lindsay Kemp).

Having made some early experiments in the late '90s with a production called The Other Woman, in 2002 Tomasini started to create (in various capacities) his own shows and first attracted attention with an appearance at the Edinburgh Festival with True or Falsetto? A Secret History of the Castrati. Written by Time Out critic Lucy Powell, the show was a sell out hit not only in Edinburgh but also in London for two seasons and on international tours, in three different languages. This was followed by Ernesto's own script for The Veiled Screen: A Secret History of Hollywood! which has had two London runs in 2006, sponsored by the Arts Council of England. Tomasini's style of performance – an operatic, dark and twisted blend of Italian Cabaret, avant-garde performance art and thought-provoking Vaudeville – has been described "as shocking as it is moving".

From 2013, after a six-year period dedicated almost exclusively to music, he returned to theatre with three new plays written especially for him: Andrea Cusumano's Petit Cheval Blanc, Roberta Torre's Aida and Il Mutamento's Mamma Schiavona. In 2017 he debuted his own musical comedy, Beato chi ci crede, at the Out Off Theatre in Milan.

As avant-garde comedian and cabaret artist he has performed in theatres, museums, nightclubs and cultural institutes in fourteen countries around the world and has collaborated with artists as diverse as Stephen Montague, Ron Athey, Carlos Motta and with the Resonance Radio Orchestra.

Very active in the fashion world, Tomasini performed at the shows of hat designer Nasir Mazhar for the 2008 and 2009 London Fashion Week and for Carlo Volpi at Pitti Uomo 2017.

Music
For the past 15 years he has been lending his wide vocal range to experimental music, singing an eclectic repertoire written by him or for him by a multitude of musicians, and, in the process, becoming an international cult figure. He also performs a more classical repertoire, often alongside opera stars, in opera houses and concert halls. A wide vocal range combined with his melodramatic delivery have interested the press: Frontiers magazine described him as "the most exciting and flamboyant personality to shake up the opera world since Klaus Nomi" and Italian newspaper La Repubblica called him a "prominent figure in avant-garde circuits with his seducing high voice reminiscent of those belonging to evirated singers".

In June 2022 he was among the highlights of the Toscanini Festival in Parma and Reggio Emilia, singing Cabaret chansons from the early 20th Century, with soprano Hila Baggio, directed by Omer Meir Wellber. In 2020 he sang at the end of year concert of the Teatro Massimo in Palermo, also under the baton of maestro Wellber, alongside soprano Carmen Giannattasio and baritone Markus Werba. 2020 also saw the release of a second compilation album by the Lacerba label in which Ernesto appears alongside Myss Keta, Federico Fiumani and others. He opens “Amour Braque“, Spiritual Front‘s 2018 album and live shows. The previous year he collaborated with producer Man Parrish on two records and performed his one man entertainment, “One Life To Live!“, at the National Theatres of Germany and Italy.
Tomasini collaborated with electronic producer Shackleton, who wrote for him "Devotional Songs“, the critically acclaimed live show and album, which was among the best of 2016 for The Wire, The Quietus and many more.
Tomasini is singer/songwriter of the prog-rock band Almagest!, with which he tours extensively, appearing in venues like the Volksbuehne in Berlin and festivals like the Kurt Weill Fest.

He has sung his repertoire in London venues like the Royal Albert Hall (main house and Elgar Room), Purcell Room, National Theatre, Roundhouse, Cadogan Hall, Tate Britain, National Portrait Gallery, and in historical theatres, museums and churches around the world. As a recording artist he sings on 17 albums, four singles, five music videos and on the soundtrack of a film by Bruce LaBruce.

On radio he has sung, acted and was interviewed on all the BBC stations, Classic FM, RAI Radio3, Radio Nacional de España, Radio New Zealand and on major stations in France, Germany, Brazil and the US.

Other
In 2012 he was included in the Theatre/Music section of Eccellenza Italiana (Italian Excellency, with presentation by the President of the Republic of Italy, Giorgio Napolitano), for representing Italy in the world. In 2013 he was awarded the prize "Sicilian in the World" and in 2016 received the keys to the city by the mayor of his hometown of Palermo.
A lecturer on theatre history and techniques he has given master-classes to drama students in England, Spain and Mexico. Tomasini is the only Italian to have given a masterclass at RADA Royal Academy of Dramatic Art.
His work and performance style are discussed in four books and an academic essay. 
For two years (2010–2012) Ernesto was the London correspondent of the Italian magazine Musical!.

Discography
 Black Widow (album, 2007) Beta Lactam-ring Records
 Black Sea (album, 2007) Beta Lactam-ring Records
 When I Leave You (single, 2007) Othon Mataragas
 Canes Venatici (album, 2007) Blossoming Noise
 Otto; or, Up With Dead People (soundtrack album, 2008) Crippled Dick Hot Wax!
 Digital Angel (album, 2008) Durtro Jnana
 The Hunting Dogs of Boötes the Herdsman (album, 2010) Chew-z
 Last Night I Paid To Close My Eyes (single, 2011) Cherry Red/SFE
 Impermanence (album, 2011) Cherry Red/SFE
 Impermanence (single, 2012) Cherry Red/SFE
 Düde (album, 2012) Tin Angel Records
 Messier Objects (album 2013) Tourette Records
 InSonar, L'Enfant et le Ménure (album, 2013) Lizard Records
 Dawn Yet To Come (single, 2014) Cherry Red/SFE
 Pineal (album, 2014) Cherry Red/SFE
 Devotional Songs (album, 2016) Honest Jon
 Madame E (album, 2017) Undogmatisch
 Star (album, 2017) Parrish Digital
 Fun House Mirrors (album, 2017) Backwards Records
 Plaisir (single, 2018) Undogmatisch
 LB/R La Bellezza Riunita (album, 2018) Lacerba
 Amour Braque (album, 2018) Prophecy
 La Bellezza Eccetera (album, 2020) Lacerba

Bibliography
 Autori vari. Incontroazione 70/96 – 20 anni + 1, Theatrum Mundi Edizioni 1997
 Marinelli, Manlio. Per un teatro degli spazi, Theatrum Mundi Edizioni, 2001
 Scarlini, Luca. Lustrini per il regno dei cieli. Bollati Boringhieri, 2008
 Autori vari. Teatro Libero. Quarant’anni: Le creazioni di Beno Mazzone e Lia Chiappara, 1969–2009, Theatrum Mundi Edizioni 2009
 
 Tomaz Pires, Luìs. The Julie Andrews Visual Encyclopedia. Lisbon: Pires, 2011
 Cazzato, Luigi (cur). Orizzonte sud. Besa, 2011
 Jackson, Stanley. Get Me a Celebrity. Ecademy Press, 2011
 Guarracino, Serena. Donne di passioni, Editoria&Spettacolo, 2011
 Palumbo Crocco, Cristina (with a preface by the President of the Republic of Italy Giorgio Napolitano). Eccellenza Italiana. Rubbettino, 2012
 Pajdic, Predrag & Nash, JL. Beneath the Shadows the Soul Walks. The Pandorian, 2012
 Johnson, Dominic (cur). Pleading in the Blood: The Art and Performances of Ron Athey. Intellect Live, 2013
 Esposito, Igor. Torre, Roberta. Tomasini, Ernesto. Aida, il grande circo dell'aldilà. Glifo Edizioni, 2014
 Frignani, Enrico. Sofa. Frignani, 2015
 Cresti, Antonello. Solchi sperimentali Italia. Crac Edizioni, 2015
 Arrevad, Magnus. Boy Story. Red Room Books, 2015
 Pegg, Nicholas. The Complete David Bowie. Titan Books, 2016
 McLeod, Jamie. I Created Me. Timeless, 2017
 McAllister-Viel, Tara. Training Actors' Voices. Routledge, 2018
 Sartorius, Benedikt. Listen Up! 313 Popletter. Edition Taberna Kritika, 2021

Selection of Work in Variety, Cabaret and Performance Art
The LA Italian Revue (variety – 1984, USA)
The Victoria Series (cabaret – 1988/93, I)
Support for Nino Frassica (cabaret – 1991, I)
The Lenny Beige Show at the Regency Rooms (variety – 1998, UK)
The Amazing Tomasini at the Tron Theatre, Glasgow (cabaret – 2001, UK)
Stars Fall From Heaven at the Colourscape Festival (performance art – 2006, UK)
The History of Ecstasy at MADRE Museum, Naples (performance art – 2009, I)
Tomasini/Macabra Trans4Leben at the MILKandLEAD art gallery, London (performance art – 2011, UK)
Lascia o raddoppia? (performance art – 2011, UK)
Alternative Miss Liverpool (cabaret – 2011, UK)
Franko B's Untouchable (cabaret −2013, UK)
New Year Celebrations in Piazza Politeama, Palermo (variety – 2015, I)
Bowie Night at Ace Hotel, London (with Lindsay Kemp, Marc Almond, Holly Johnson. variety – 2016, UK)
Heavenly Voices/Sensual Bodies at the Teatro Massimo, Palermo (illustrated lecture – 2017, I)

Selection of Theatre Work
Morte nella notte di Natale (play – 1988, I)
Ballarò (play – 1989, I)
Nasci lu iornu (musical – 1993, I)
Volti Lunari (play – 1994, UK)
Reunion in Genthin (play – 1995, UK)
Grand Hotel – The Musical (musical – 1995, UK)
The Tempest (play – 1995, UK)
Varietè (dark operetta – 1996/97, UK)
The Other Woman (compilation musical – 1998/99, UK)
The Conquering Hero of Seville (play – 1999, UK)
Mr China's Son (multimedia play with music – 2002, UK)
True or Falsetto? A Secret History of the Castrati (one man musical – 2002–2007, UK + world tour)
The Englishman Sits in a Caravan at St Osyth/Singing (opera – 2003, UK)
Cabaret – The Musical (musical – 2003, UK)
Chicago – The Musical (musical – 2004/05, UK)
The Veiled Screen: A Secret History of Hollywood (one man musical – 2005/06, UK)
Camurrìa! (musical – 2008, UK)
Petit Cheval Blanc (play – 2013, India)
Aida (musical – 2014, I)
Mamma Schiavona (play with music – 2014, I)
Beato chi ci crede (musical – 2017, I)

Selection of TV, Film and Radio Work
Premio Anna Magnani (RAI 3, TV – 1990, I)
Woman's Hour (BBC Radio 4 – 1998, UK)
Outlook (BBC World Radio – 2002)
Thunderpants (Pathè, Film – 2002, UK)
Walking the Outer Road (Radio New Zealand – 2003, NZ)
Crowded Skies (BBC2, TV – 2003, UK)
Dream Team (Sky, TV – 2004, UK)
The Bottle Factory Outing (BBC Radio 4 – 2005, UK)
Children of Men (Universal Pictures, Film – 2006, USA)
Siglo 21 (Radio 3 Nacional de España – 2007, Es)
Otto; or, Up with Dead People (Film soundtrack – 2008, Ger)
Stoo Kuinnutu (music video – Reverso – 2009, Ger)
Othon & Tomasini en vivo a la Bienal de Zamora (Radio Nacional de España – 2009, Es)
Forget Me Not (Quicksilver Films, Film – 2010, UK)
Carne cruda (Othon & Tomasini en vivo y entrevista) (Radio Nacional de España – 2010, Es)
Last Night I Paid To Close My Eyes (music video – Cherry Red/SFE – 2011, UK/Dm)
Impermanence (music video – Cherry Red/SFE – 2012, UK/Dm)
Heavenly Voices: The Legacy of Farinelli (documentary – Tico Films – 2013, EU)
 Ciurè (Sicial Star, Film - 2022, I)

Selection of Concerts and Recitals
COPA at the Royal Albert Hall (concert – 2001, UK)
State of the Nation at the Purcell Room (concert – 2002, UK)
Andrew Liles + Ernesto Tomasini & Nurse With Wound at the Sala Apolo, Barcelona (concert – 2007, Es)
Othon & Tomasini's First European tour (concert – 2007/08 EU)
The Angelic Conversation with Peter Christopherson's The Threshold HouseBoys Choir in Turin (concert – 2008, I)
Current 93 at Queen Elizabeth Hall, London, with guests Antony, Marc Almond and Ernesto Tomasini (concert – 2008, UK)
Andrew Liles + Ernesto Tomasini & Nurse With Wound at the Wet Sounds Festival, London (concert – 2008, UK)
Palumbo/Tomasini's Canes Venatici live at the Auditòrio de Serralves, Porto (concert – 2008, PT)
London Fashion Week, Nasir Mazhar spring show, London (recital – 2009, UK)
Ernesto Tomasini sings: Othon, Canes Venatici and Andrew Liles at the PRE Final Fest, Rome (concert – 2009, I)
Othon & Tomasini at The Queen Elizabeth Hall (The Front Room), London (recital – 2009, UK)
Othon & Tomasini special guests at Marc Almond's Roundhouse concert, London (concert – 2009, UK)
Othon & Tomasini in the West End (Leicester Square Theatre), London (concert – 2010, UK)
Othon & Tomasini at the National Portrait Gallery, London (concert – 2010, UK)
Palumbo/Tomasini's Canes Venatici live at the Volksbuehne, Berlin (concert – 2010, D)
Othon & Tomasini at the Teatro Lara, Madrid (concert – 2010, Es)
Palumbo/Tomasini's Almagest! at the Kampnagel, Hamburg (concert – 2011, D)
Palumbo/Tomasini's Almagest! at the Natural History Museum, Turin (concert – 2011, I)
Tomasini/Macabra Trans4Leben at the Drop Dead Festival, Berlin (concert – 2011, D)
Othon & Tomasini at Chelsea Theatre, Impermanence (concert – 2011 UK)
Othon & Tomasini Live in London at St Leonard's Church Shoreditch (concert – 2012 UK)
Almagest! at Kurt Weill Fest (concert – 2013, D)
Poems After Lorca at the Cadogan Hall, London (concert −2014, UK)
Pineal at the Garage, London (concert – 2014, UK)
Deliquium at Electrowerks, London (concert – 2015, UK)
TG Body Probe at the Coronet, London (concert – 2015, UK)
Ninja Tunes at St John at Hackney, London (concert – 2015, UK)
Shackleton/Tomasini at CaixaForum, Madrid and Barcelona (concert – 2015, Es)
Tomasini Masterclass at RADA, Royal Academy of Dramatic Arts (recital – 2016, UK)
Ernesto Tomasini Live, Teatro Biondo, Palermo (recital – 2016, UK)
Shackleton/Tomasini at Arma17, Moscow (concert – 2016, RU)
Shackleton/Tomasini at EYE, Amsterdam (concert – 2016, NL)
Concerto di San Silvestro at Teatro Massimo, Palermo (concert - 2020, I)
Cabaret! Toscanini Festival, Reggio Emilia (concert - 2022, I)

References

External links

 Ernesto Tomasini official website
 Ernesto Tomasini on Facebook
 Ernesto Tomasini at Last.fm

 British Theatre Guide review by Gill Stoker, 2003
 La Stampa article from 2007
 Mixtape interview by Biku Stratake on Greek National Press, 2007

1968 births
British male film actors
Musicians from Palermo
Living people
British male radio actors
British male television actors
Male actors from Palermo